Emmerson Nogueira ao Vivo is the second live album by Brazilian acoustic rock cover musician Emmerson Nogueira, released on CD and DVD in 2007 through Sony BMG. It was recorded on January 24, 2007 at Moinho Eventos, São Paulo.

Track listing

References 

Emmerson Nogueira albums
2007 live albums
Covers albums